The Autobianchi Stellina is a small spider from the Italian automaker, Autobianchi (partly owned by the Fiat group at the time), built for only two years, 1964 and 1965. It was based on the mechanicals of the chassis Fiat 600D, but had a unique unibody structure, with the outside panels made of fibreglass reinforced plastics, based on a steel frame. It was the first Italian car with a fibreglass body, and one of the first in the world. Powered by Fiat 600D's rear-mounted, water-cooled 767 cc straight-4 engine, delivering , the Stellina had drum brakes on all four wheels.

With sleek styling penned by Luigi Rapi, the Stellina was first presented as a prototype at the 1963 Turin Motor Show, and went on sale a year later with a price tag of almost a million lira. Only 502 Stellinas were made until production ceased in 1965, when Fiat launched a, slightly larger, similar Fiat 850 Spider.

References 

Stellina
Rear-wheel-drive vehicles
Rear-engined vehicles